For the Best of Us is an album by John Doe, the co-founder of the Los Angeles-based punk rock band X. It was released on Yep Roc Records on July 25, 2006. The album is a repackaging of an EP Doe originally released in 1998 on the Kill Rock Stars label, entitled For the Rest of Us. Doe is billed as "The John Doe Thing" on the album.

Track listing
All tracks composed by John Doe; except where indicated
"A Step Outside"
"Let's Get Lost"
"The Unhappy Song"
"Bad, Bad Feelings"
"This Loving Thing"
"Criminal"
"Broken Smile"
"Come Home"
"Zero"
"Vigilante Man" (Woody Guthrie)

Personnel
Travis Dickerson –	Mastering
John Doe –	Bass, Guitar, Vocals
Tim Hale –	Photography
Smokey Hormel –	Guitar, Vocals
Neil Kellerhouse –	Design
Tony Marsico –	Bass
Steven McDonald –	Bass 
Viggo Mortensen –	Photography
Joey Waronker –	Drums, Percussion
Dave Way –	Drum Programming, Engineer, Mixing, Producer

References

2006 albums
Yep Roc Records albums
John Doe (musician) albums